is a train station in Chūō-ku, Kobe, Hyōgo Prefecture, Japan.

Lines
Hankyu Railway
Kōbe Main Line

Layout 
The station is served by a single island platform serving two tracks.

History 
The station opened on 1 April 1936.

Operations were suspended from June 1945 until May 1946.

Kasuganomichi Station was damaged by the Great Hanshin earthquake in January 1995. Restoration work on the Kobe Line took 7 months to complete.

Station numbering was introduced on 21 December 2013, with Kasuganomichi being designated as station number HK-15.

Upgrades were done to the station starting in November 2020 to promote universal design. This included the installation of elevators and accessible washrooms.

References

External links 

 Station website (in Japanese)

Railway stations in Hyōgo Prefecture
Hankyū Kōbe Main Line
Railway stations in Japan opened in 1936